Andrew A. Bershak (November 8, 1915 – November 19, 1943) was an American football player.  He played college football at University of North Carolina at Chapel Hill and was a consensus selection at the end position on the 1937 College Football All-America Team. Bershak also played basketball at North Carolina and led both the basketball and football teams to Southern Conference championships.

Bershak later served as an assistant football coach and scout for North Carolina. He died in 1943 in Clairton, Pennsylvania.

References

1915 births
1943 deaths
American football ends
American men's basketball players
North Carolina Tar Heels football players
North Carolina Tar Heels men's basketball players
All-American college football players
People from Clairton, Pennsylvania
Players of American football from Pennsylvania
Basketball players from Pennsylvania
Deaths from nephritis